Mark Cawthra  is an English musician and record producer working in the UK.  He was born in Bishop's Stortford, Hertfordshire, England.

Biography
Cawthra's first serious musical activity was in an early (unnamed) music project with schoolfriend Tim Smith (bass guitar) and David Philpot (keyboards), a band in which he was the drummer. The music, a mix of jazz and rock, drew inspiration from the "Canterbury" bands, particularly Egg.

After a period of playing drums with other musicians around Kingston upon Thames, he moved to North Yorkshire and lived there for the whole of 1978. He returned to London in 1979, following an invitation to join Tim and Jim Smith in Cardiac Arrest (replacing Peter Tagg on drums). Other members of the band at this time were Colvin Mayers (keyboards), (later to play with Adrian Borland in the Sound), and Mick Pugh (vocals). The Cardiac Arrest album The Obvious Identity was recorded at this time. Subsequently, he and Tim Smith recorded the band – now renamed Cardiacs – for a number of sessions in a small Surbiton studio. The results became the Cardiacs demo album Toy World.

Following a short period in 1982 in which he was Cardiacs' keyboard player and percussionist, he left the band, moved to Birmingham and briefly worked with two of the remaining members of the Birmingham band Dangerous Girls, following their split. The line-up, calling itself TAAGA, produced one single, "Friend of Mine", working with UB40 producer Bob Lamb.

On returning to London, he worked for the remainder of the 1980s as crew member or live sound engineer, touring with several acts including Immaculate Fools, It's Immaterial, and Then Jerico. He was also Cardiacs front-of-house engineer at this time, and a member of the band Grown Ups with William D. Drake, Elaine Herman, Jon Bastable (The Trudy), Dominic Luckman and Craig Fortnam. Five tracks were recorded by this line-up but never released.

From 1988, his work was based in and around Leeds, culminating in the building of a 48-track facility, That Studio Where he worked with This et al, producing demo material prior to the release of their Baby Machine album, and with the North Sea Radio Orchestra, mixing their first two albums. The studio was closed down in 2007.

Today, his work is all studio-based, recording and mixing demos and masters in a new home facility in Leeds. Mixing credits include the Emmett Elvin albums Bloody Marvels, Assault on the Tyranny of Reason and The End of Music, and the Gong album, Rejoice! I'm Dead! working alongside Dave Sturt. His mastering credits in addition to the North Sea Radio Orchestra and Emmett Elvin albums, William D. Drake's second album, Briny Hooves, as well as releases by Local Girls, the post-Oceansize project British Theatre, Charlie Cawood, Knifeworld, and Khyam Allami's debut Resonance/Dissonance, the latter nominated for the 2012 Songlines music award.

He contributed a track and compiled and mastered Leader of the Starry Skies: A Tribute to Tim Smith, Songbook 1, an album produced to gain funds for Tim Smith and his ongoing care, and raise awareness of his work. His first solo project Redbus Noface album #1 If It Fights The Hammer It will Fight The Knife was released on Believer's Roast in 2011. He compiled and mastered the Believers Roast Exquisite Corpse Game, a collection of contiguous fragments by various artists each of whom has only heard the closing 20 seconds of the previous section. J. G. Thirlwell, Bob Drake, Weasel Walter, Max Tundra and Katherine Blake were among the contributors.

Discography

With Cardiac Arrest
 The Obvious Identity cassette album (1980)

With Cardiacs
 Toy World Cassette (1981)
 The Seaside (1st Version and CD) Cassette/CD (1984) ALPH 001
 Archive Cardiacs Cassette/CD (1989) ALPH 000

As Mark Cawthra
 Songs by Cardiacs and Affectionate Friends - "Truth Be Told" CD (2001) ORG228
 Leader Of The Starry Skies: A Tribute To Tim Smith, Songbook 1 - "Let Alone My Plastic Doll" CD (2010) Believers Roast
 The Rising Of The Lights - William D Drake - "Me Fish Bring" CD (2011) Onomatopoeia

As Redbus Noface
 Redbus Noface - If It Fights The Hammer It Will Fight The Knife CD (2011) Believers Roast
 Redbus Noface - The Central Element - "Jack Blind Acid" CD (2012) Believers Roast
Redbus Noface - EP #1 Crumbs In The Deathbed (2021) Self-released

Other information
Mark's brother was the guitarist Gypie Mayo.

Cardiacs Rude Bootleg was recorded from the mixing desk by Mark on a cassette deck in the effects rack at the Reading Festival. The EQ settings on the mixing desk were left behind from the band who had played last on the night before, Saxon, and needed little alteration.

Cawthra may be seen briefly dancing to Cardiacs' "R.E.S" in the Seaside Treats video.

References

External links
Redbus Noface on Bandcamp
Cardiacs homepage

Living people
People from Bishop's Stortford
English record producers
Cardiacs members
Year of birth missing (living people)